Lebogang or Lebohang is a South African given name which is often shortened to Lebo. It may refer to
Lebogang Mabatle (born 1992), South African football defender
Lebogang Manyama (born 1990), South African footballer 
Lebogang Mashile (born 1979), South African actor, writer and poet
Lebohang Mokoena (born 1986), South African football player
Lebohang K. Moleko, Lesotho diplomat
Lebogang Moloto (born 1992), South African footballer 
Lebo M. (Lebohang Morake, born 1964), South African producer and composer
Lebogang Morula (born 1968), South African football player
Lebo Mothiba (born 1996), South African footballer
Lebogang Phiri (born 1994), South African footballer
Lebogang Ramalepe (born 1991), South African football defender
Lebogang Shange (born 1990), South African race walker

African given names